Jack Hunter may refer to:

People 
Jack Hunter (English footballer) (1852–1903), English footballer
Jackie Hunter (1903–1951), Canadian entertainer
Jack Hunter (Australian footballer) (1914–1990), Australian rules footballer
Jack D. Hunter (1921–2009), writer
Jack Hunter (radio host) (born 1974), libertarian radio host and columnist
Jack Hunter (cricketer) (born 1995), New Zealand cricketer

Television 
Jack Hunter (film series), a 2008 television film series parodying Indiana Jones
Jack Hunter, the series' protagonist, played by Ivan Sergei 
Jack Hunter (Boy Meets World), a character in the TV show Boy Meets World

See also
John Hunter (disambiguation)